The Houston Negro Hospital School of Nursing Building is a school building at the Houston Negro Hospital complex, now named Riverside General Hospital, located at the intersection of Holman Avenue and Ennis Street in Houston, Harris County,  Texas.

The Houston Negro Hospital School of Nursing has the distinction of being the first school in Houston created for the express purpose of training black nurses. The attached medical facility, the first non-profit hospital for Black patients in Houston, provided work for black physicians who were normally barred from admitting patients to segregated Houston hospitals.

Construction 
In 1918, Houston philanthropist Joseph S. Cullinan, established a fund to erect a fifty-bed hospital. Later, Texas oilman J. S. Cullinan, donated $80,000 to build the Hospital and the City of Houston donated the land.

The Spanish Colonial Revival style building began construction in 1925 and the school was officially opened in 1927. Dedication of the building occurred on June 19, 1926, to coincide with 61st anniversary of Juneteeth, despite ongoing construction.

The first administrator was I.M. Terrell

National Register 
It was added to the National Register of Historic Places on December 27, 1982.

See also
 Houston Negro Hospital
 National Register of Historic Places listings in Houston, Texas
 National Register of Historic Places listings in Harris County, Texas

References

1931 establishments in Texas
African-American history of Texas
Hospital buildings completed in 1931
Hospitals in Houston
National Register of Historic Places in Houston
School buildings on the National Register of Historic Places in Texas
Schools in Houston
Spanish Colonial Revival architecture in Texas